Hendrika Bante (14 April 1901 – 26 March 1982) was a Dutch diver. She competed in the women's 3 metre springboard event at the 1924 Summer Olympics.

References

External links
 

1901 births
1982 deaths
Dutch female divers
Olympic divers of the Netherlands
Divers at the 1924 Summer Olympics
Divers from Amsterdam
20th-century Dutch women
20th-century Dutch people